The 1972 United States presidential election in Montana took place on November 7, 1972, and was part of the 1972 United States presidential election. Voters chose four representatives, or electors to the Electoral College, who voted for president and vice president.

Montana strongly voted for the Republican nominee, President Richard Nixon, over the Democratic nominee, Senator George McGovern. Nixon won Montana by a margin of 20.08%, making Montana around 4% more Democratic than the nation at large; McGovern's vote share was 0.4% higher than it was nationally. This was the first time since 1928 that Sheridan County voted Republican. As of the 2020 U.S. presidential election, this is the last time Montana shifted in favor of the incumbent President's party, as in the 12 subsequent presidential elections after 1972, it would shift away from every incumbent President's party.

Results

Results by county

See also
 United States presidential elections in Montana

References

Montana
1972
1972 Montana elections